"Chill of the Night!" is episode 37 of Batman: The Brave and the Bold. The plot follows Batman as he comes closer to confronting Joe Chill, the man who killed his parents. Unbeknownst to him, his decision on how to handle Chill will not only determine the criminal's fate but his own. This episode is also featured as an extra on the "DC Showcase Original Shorts Collection" animated DVD feature. This has been listed as one of Bruce Timm's favorite episodes.

Background
The episode is a re-telling of Batman's origin story. Paul Dini, writer of many of the scripts for Batman: The Animated Series, wrote the script for this episode. Michael Chang directed the episode. The episode first aired on April 9, 2010. People who voiced characters in Batman: The Animated Series and who acted in the 1960s Batman television series returned to voice characters in this episode: Kevin Conroy (the voice of Batman) voices the Phantom Stranger, Mark Hamill (the voice of the Joker) voices Spectre, Richard Moll (the voice of Two-Face) voices Lew Moxon, Adam West (the actor that played Batman in the 1960s Batman television series) voices Thomas Wayne, Julie Newmar (the actress that played Catwoman in the 1960s Batman television series) voices Martha Wayne, and Jennifer Hale also reprises her role of Zatanna from Justice League Unlimited (which was in continuity with Batman: The Animated Series). There are more scenes that are in shadows than in previous episodes, and Batman's costume is noticeably darker. The episode has images and sequences that are a homage to Batman: The Animated Series. The comic book limited series Untold Legend of the Batman is the basis for this episode. Before the episode aired, Scott Thill of Wired said that this episode promises a return to Batman's murderous darkness. In a video interview about this episode for Comic Book Movie, producer Michael Jelenic said that Paul Dini will be working on a third episode (the first one featured Bat-Mite).

Plot summary
Adhering to its customary format, the show opens with a teaser involving an escapade unrelated to the main episode. The criminal magician Abra Kadabra attempts to steal artifacts of famous stage magicians from a museum, only to be thwarted by Batman and Zatanna.

The main story begins with the murder of Thomas Wayne and his wife Martha, while their young son Bruce looks on in horror. That night, Bruce tearfully swears to avenge his parents' deaths by spending the rest of his life battling crime. As he grows up, he studies criminology and martial arts, eventually becoming Batman. In the present day, The Spectre and The Phantom Stranger debate what Batman will do once he confronts his parents' murderer, which he will do on this night. They eventually wager on it: Phantom Stranger wagers that if Batman upholds justice, he is free to live his life the way he always has. On the other hand, Spectre wagers that if Batman gives in to vengeance, he himself will become like Spectre.

That evening, Batman (disguised as a priest) tries to learn from Lew Moxon, a dying gangster who ordered the hit on the Waynes, the name of the killer. Moxon expresses his regret at making their son an orphan as he only meant to have Thomas killed and not Martha. In his last few seconds, Moxon manages to say "some guy named... chill" before dying. Batman then heads to a bar to interrogate other criminals for further information, but they claim to know nothing. After Batman threatens to kill a man he is interrogating, the Phantom Stranger restrains him, taking him back to a charity costume party that his parents attended, revealing the reason for Batman's costume as being based on young Bruce's subconscious memory of his father's "Bat-man" costume. For a joyful moment, Batman is reunited with his parents. The gala is interrupted by thugs led by Moxon who show up to rob the party. Batman and Thomas fight together against the gang, managing to capture Moxon. One of the other thugs, who Batman recognizes as the killer, holds Martha hostage only to be rescued by Batman and Thomas. Batman races after the escaping thug, only for the Spectre to appear before him. He asks what Batman will do once he identifies his parents' killer. Batman has no easy answer. Spectre then shows Batman a meeting between Moxon and the other man at Blackgate Penitentiary. The man, who Moxon calls "Chill", offers to "make the Waynes suffer" for Moxon in retaliation for their interference. Moxon casually agrees, much to Batman's disgust. Batman realizes that the dying Moxon had identified the killer to him - "Chill", and vows that "This ends before dawn".

Returned by Spectre to the Batcave, Batman uncovers that Joe Chill now sells exotic weapons to supervillains. Batman interrupts that night's sale, fighting off the assembled villains while focusing on his true target: Chill. Batman corners Chill in an office, disarming him and revealing that he is the son of Thomas Wayne, unmasking himself as Bruce Wayne onscreen for the first time in the series. Bruce then beats him and now has Chill at his mercy, as the Phantom Stranger and Spectre each appear to persuade him, respectively, to uphold justice or exact vengeance. While the Phantom Stranger says that Chill is beaten, Spectre points out that "if this man lives, Batman dies". Bruce responds by saying "Batman may die, but Bruce Wayne? Never" and lets Chill go. Panicked, Joe Chill begs the villains for protection against Batman, revealing that he is indirectly responsible for the hero's existence by killing his parents (without mentioning who Batman really is). However, the villains turn on him for creating the vigilante that has always stopped them, resulting in a brawl that accidentally sets off the sonic laser Chill was trying to sell them earlier. The weapon's beam sends the ceiling crashing down on Chill, killing him as the other villains flee. The Stranger says that Batman made the proper choice and that fate ultimately overtook Chill. He then mentions how convenient it was that Chill just happened to be under the collapsing ceiling at just the right moment. The Spectre only smiles and says "I wouldn't know anything about that".

The episode ends with Bruce enshrining his father's bat costume within the Batcave and declaring "Case... closed." He then turns around and walks away.

Reception
The episode received mostly positive reviews and is often regarded as the show's best episode. Joe Oesterle, of Mania, said that this episode ranks among the best of The Brave and the Bold, proving this show is as capable of presenting more than one version of Batman. Dan Phillips, of IGN, said that this episode is the best in the series. The founder of Batman-On-Film praised the episode for its cast.

Voice cast
Diedrich Bader - Bruce Wayne / Batman, Solomon Grundy
Adam West - Thomas Wayne
Julie Newmar - Martha Wayne
Kevin Conroy - Phantom Stranger
Mark Hamill - Spectre
Richard Moll - Lew Moxon, Two-Face
Jennifer Hale - Zatanna, Poison Ivy
Jeff Bennett - Joker, Abra Kadabra, Mobster
Zachary Gordon - Young Bruce Wayne
Peter Onorati - Joe Chill

References

External links

The World's Finest Review (owned by Toon Zone)

Batman: The Brave and the Bold episodes
2010 American television episodes
DC Comics animated television episodes
Batman television series episodes